Colm Boyle (born 29 July 1986) is a Gaelic footballer who plays for Davitts and, formerly, the Mayo county team. He won four All Star Awards and played in four finals of the All-Ireland Senior Football Championship, losing them all and scoring an own goal in the third.

Career
Boyle won six Connacht Senior Football Championships and a National Football League title.

He started at left half-back in three All-Ireland football finals: the 2012 decider, which Mayo lost to Donegal by a scoreline of 0-13 to 2-11 and the 2013 decider, which Mayo lost to Dublin by a scoreline of 1-14 to 2-12. The 2017 All-Ireland Senior Football Championship Final, his fourth, was the third final in which he started at left half-back and it was another loss to Dublin.

Before that he started in the centre in the 2016 All-Ireland Senior Football Championship Final as Mayo lost again, though Dublin needed a replay on this occasion.

He missed the 2020 and 2021 All-Ireland Senior Football Championship Final losses to Dublin and Tyrone respectively, due to a torn anterior cruciate ligament, and retired from inter-county football at the end of 2021.

Boyle made an appearance for Ireland against Australia in the 2013 International Rules Series, scoring a total of one over.

Boyle was named coach and selector of the Mayo minor team ahead of the 2023 season.

References

1986 births
Living people
All Stars Awards winners (football)
Gaelic football backs
Gaelic football coaches
Gaelic football selectors
Garda Síochána officers
Irish international rules football players
Mayo inter-county Gaelic footballers
People from Castlebar